The 2016 Croatian Cup Final was a one-legged affair played between Dinamo Zagreb and Slaven Belupo. The final was played in Osijek on 10 May 2016.

Road to the final

Match details

External links 
Official website 

2016 Final
GNK Dinamo Zagreb matches
Cup Final